The Silver Logie for Most Outstanding Supporting Actress is an award presented annually at the Australian TV Week Logie Awards. It was first awarded at the 58th Annual TV Week Logie Awards in 2016 and is given to recognise the outstanding performance of supporting actresses in an Australian program. The winner and nominees of this award are chosen by television industry juries. Celia Ireland was the first winner for her role in Wentworth.

Winners and nominees

References

Awards established in 2016

Television awards for Best Supporting Actress